Limésy is a commune in the Seine-Maritime department in the Normandy region in northern France.

Historical significance
Limésy was the origin of one of the greatest and most powerful families in Norman Britain, the de Limesi family. In the Domesday survey of 1086 they held 40 Lordships, and Ralph de Limesy, nephew of William the Conqueror founded Hertford priory. They also held smaller manors all over the Britain such as the manor of Merryfield (Muriefeld 1233) in West Tisted and other lands in he neighboring parish of Ropley.

Geography

Population

Places of interest
 The church of St.Martin, dating from the nineteenth century.
 The thirteenth-century château and park.
 Ruins of a château at the hamlet of Brunville.
 The seventeenth-century château of Etennemare.

See also
Communes of the Seine-Maritime department

References

Communes of Seine-Maritime